El-Mansoura Stadium  is a multi-use stadium in El Mansoura, Egypt.  It is used mostly for football matches, and hosts the home games of El Mansoura SC.  The stadium holds 18,000 people. It opened in 1962.

Football venues in Egypt
Mansoura, Egypt